Clarence Owen (Tim) Cooper (17 October 1899 – 5 April 1966) was a Progressive Conservative party member of the House of Commons of Canada. He was born in Meaford, Ontario and became a farmer by career.

He was first elected at the Rosetown—Biggar riding in the 1958 general election, then re-elected there in 1962 and 1963. After completing his third and final term in 1965, the 26th Canadian Parliament, Cooper left federal office due to ill health and did not seek further re-election.

External links
 

Born October 17, 1899
Died April 5, 1966
Saskatoon, Sask.

Clarence Owen (Tim) Cooper.
Personal and Family History
CO Cooper or "Tim" as he was known to most everyone was a successful farmer and politician from Hawarden, Sask. His ancestors were United Empire Loyalist's who fled the United States in the late 1700s after the American Revolution. They crossed into Canada through Lake Erie and ended up settling in southern Ontario near Selkirk, Ont. His mother died when he was 4 years old. His father was a masterful stone and marble carver but the dust caused lung problems so they decided to move west in 1917 settling in Strongfield, Sask.

In those days money was scarce and once Tim completed Grade 8 his education was considered complete. When Tim was 20 years old he was working in a logging camp in Big River, Sask. Tim slipped on some ice and fell into a circular saw that severed his right arm just below the elbow. It was a miracle he survived but the loggers, not knowing what else to do, put his arm into a bag of flour. He was transported by horse and sleigh to the nearest hospital 100 miles away in Prince Albert, Sask.

He married Lelia Potter in 1924 and they had four children. Maxene (b.1926), George (b.1930), Gerald (b.1932) and Darlene (b.1935). 
Tim worked for farmers and sold Watkin's products to make a living. In 1933, during the height of the Great Depression and the severe drought called the Dirty Thirties, Tim, Lelia and family moved to a farm near Hawarden, Sask to live with Lelia's parents. In 1936 he was hired by a mortgage company to manage a 640-acre farm that had been abandoned as so many farms were in those days. People fled the Province for British Columbia or Ontario. 
In 1937 there wasn't a bushel of wheat threshed. In 1939 the rains returned and Tim finally had a great crop. He made his annual trip to Regina to meet with the mortgage company and surprised everyone upon returning with title for the farm and a robin egg blue 1936 Studebaker. This wouldn't be the first great move that Tim would make. He expanded into cattle, pigs and chickens. He continued to be the eternal optimist in farming and slowly expanded to own 3 sections, a very large farm for that time.

Tim always took an active role in the community as a referee in hockey, umpire in baseball, a school board councillor and a councillor and then Reeve for the municipality of Rosedale. 
His political life took off when he was elected as a Member of Parliament in 1958. He defeated M.J. Coldwell, leader of the CCF Party which was the precursor to the current NDP, handing Coldwell his only defeat as a politician.
Tim was elected again in 1962 and 1963 and retired prior to the 1965 election due to ill health as he suffered a major heart attack in 1964 that he never recovered from. He died in 1966.

His greatest achievement was being part of the passing of the bill to build the South Saskatchewan River Dam in 1958. His maiden speech was on that very subject and he has a Bay named after him on Lake Diefenbaker. The barn from his farm has been a landmark for many years and still stands on Highway 15, ten miles west of Kenaston, Sk bearing the sign "C.O. COOPER & SONS"

A great legacy and lesson in perseverance from a one armed man with a Grade 8 education.

1899 births
1966 deaths
Members of the House of Commons of Canada from Saskatchewan
People from Grey County
Progressive Conservative Party of Canada MPs
Place of death missing